Maeil or Mae-il (매일; 每日) is a Korean word meaning "every day". It may refer to:
Kyongbuk Maeil Shinmun, South Korean newspaper based in Pohang
Maeil Business Newspaper, South Korean newspaper based in Seoul
Daehan Maeil Sinmun, the former name of the Seoul Sinmun, South Korean newspaper based in Seoul